Thomas C. Wiegele (1932–1991) was a pioneer in the field of biopolitics. He founded the Association for Politics and the Life Sciences, and was its executive director for over a decade.

Biography
Wiegele received his bachelor's degree from Marquette University in 1956. His master's degree and Ph.D. in political science were from the University of Pennsylvania.

He was a professor of political science at St. Joseph's University in Philadelphia before accepting a position at Northern Illinois University, where he was the director of the Program for Biosocial Research.  He was the founding editor of the journal Politics and the Life Sciences, holding the post from 1981 to 1991.

Wiegele's research included a study of the effects of international situations on world leaders.  He analyzed voice recordings of world leaders to determine their stress levels.  His paper, Leaders Under Stress, was presented to the International Political Science Association in Moscow in 1979.

Wiegele married Mary Preo in 1956 in Milwaukee, Wisconsin. They had three sons and two daughters - Joseph, Madelynn, Edward, Thomas and Katherine.

Wiegele died of an aneurysm on August 9, 1991, in DeKalb, Illinois.  He had been planning to retire the day before and had been given a retirement party two days before his death.

Honors
The Thomas C. Wiegele Interdisciplinary Dissertation Completion Award is presented to Northern Illinois University Ph.D. students writing a dissertation that bridges two academic fields.
Wiegele was a Presidential Research Professor at Northern Illinois University.

Bibliography
Wiegele authored or co-authored numerous books and articles in the field of biopolitics, including:

References

American political scientists
1991 deaths
1933 births
20th-century political scientists